The 1997 Barcelona Dragons season was the fifth season for the franchise in the World League of American Football (WLAF). The team was led by head coach Jack Bicknell in his fifth year, and played its home games at Estadi Olímpic de Montjuïc in Barcelona, Catalonia, Spain. They finished the regular season in second place with a record of five wins and five losses. In World Bowl '97, Barcelona defeated the Rhein Fire 38–24. The victory marked the franchise's first World Bowl championship.

Offseason

World League draft

Personnel

Staff

Roster

Schedule

Standings

Game summaries

Week 1: at Rhein Fire

Week 3: vs Frankfurt Galaxy

Week 5: vs Amsterdam Admirals

Week 7: at Amsterdam Admirals

Week 8: vs Rhein Fire

Week 9: at Frankfurt Galaxy

World Bowl '97

Notes

References

Barcelona Dragons seasons